Dzhokhar is a male name Perso-Arabic origin, meaning "jewel". It is popular in Chechnya, Dagestan, Armenia, Azerbaijan and Iran. It is related  to the following same-origin names: 

Desi male name: Jawahar, 
Azerbaijani female name: Govhar
Armenian female names: Johar, Kohar, Gohar
Albanian male name: Xhevahir, Xhevahiri
Chechen male name: Dƶoxar

See also
Dzhokhar (disambiguation)
Dzhokhar Dudayev - Chechen Politician, 1st President of the Chechen Republic of Ichkeria
Dzhokhar Tsarnaev - Convicted perpetrator of the 2013 Boston Marathon bombings